Ellen Jones was the author of a trilogy of popular romantic novels, set in the time of Henry I, King Stephen and Henry II of England.
 
 
 
The trilogy as a whole is called The Queens of Love and War, and has been published as an omnibus edition.
 
The first novel has also been translated into Spanish and Italian.
 
 
The Fatal Crown tells the story of Maud, the Empress Matilda, daughter of Henry I, who waged a bitter civil war with her cousin Stephen over the succession to the English throne.  The unhistorical premise of the novel is that the young Maud and Stephen were also steamy lovers, and that Henry II was their illegitimate son.

The second two novels of the trilogy are devoted to the life of Eleanor of Aquitane and her marriage to Henry II.

Jones was born in New York City and graduated from Bennington College.
She later resided in Los Angeles.

References

American historical novelists
American romantic fiction writers
Living people
Year of birth missing (living people)
Writers from New York City
Bennington College alumni